New York Helicopter is a defunct American helicopter transportation company, fully owned and operated as a subsidiary of Island Helicopter Corporation which was formed in July 1980. Providing scheduled service connecting  Manhattan with the three major New York airports. Kennedy International, La Guardia and Newark International, all three are served from the East 34th Street heliport on the East River. The company also provided sightseeing and private charter operations.

Fleet
Fleet consisted of a mix of helicopters.
 2- Sikorsky S-58
 2- Aérospatiale AS 350
 7-Aérospatiale SA 360

See also 
 List of defunct airlines of the United States

References

Transportation companies based in New York City
Aviation in New York City
Defunct helicopter airlines
Defunct airlines of the United States
1980 establishments in New York City
1988 disestablishments in New York (state)
Airlines established in 1980
Airlines disestablished in 1988
Airlines based in New York (state)